The Building at 1644 Main Street, also known as Tapp's Department Store, is a historic commercial building located at Columbia, South Carolina. It was built in 1940, and enlarged in 1950.  It is a five- to seven-story, Depression Modern building faced in stucco and dark tremolite stone.  Above the main entrance is a distinctive clock face and a sign with large freestanding letters. Tapp's Department Store closed in 1995.

It was added to the National Register of Historic Places in 1979.

References

Commercial buildings on the National Register of Historic Places in South Carolina
Commercial buildings completed in 1940
Buildings and structures in Columbia, South Carolina
National Register of Historic Places in Columbia, South Carolina
Moderne architecture in South Carolina